Pelosia ankaratrae is a moth of the family Erebidae first described by Hervé de Toulgoët in 1954. It is found on Madagascar.

References

Lithosiina
Moths described in 1954